Hoàng Yến (Hoàng Yến Chibi, born 1995) is a Vietnamese singer and actress.

Hoàng Yến may also refer to:
Dang Thi Hoang Yen, Vietnamese entrepreneur and educator
, xiangqi player
Võ Hoàng Yến, a beauty pageant contestant and model